This is a list of notable peer-reviewed scientific journals that focus on bioinformatics and computational biology.

Bioinformatics
Bioinformatics